The Periac is a left tributary of the river Suciu in Romania. It flows into the Suciu in Suciu de Sus.

References

Rivers of Romania
Rivers of Maramureș County